Lewis Albanese (April 27, 1946 – December 1, 1966), born Luigi Albanese, was an Italian-born United States Army Private First Class who posthumously received the Medal of Honor for his actions during the Vietnam War.

Born in Italy, Albanese immigrated to the United States and joined the Army in 1965. During an exercise in the Republic of Vietnam, Albanese's platoon was under heavy fire from North Vietnamese positions. Albanese then bayonet charged his way to a enclosed sniper position, where he killed 8 snipers before he was mortally wounded.

Biography
Louie Albanese (in Italian Luigi) was born in Cornedo Vicentino - Vicenza, Italy and graduated from Franklin High School in Seattle, Washington. He briefly worked for Boeing before joining the Army on 26 October 1965. He received basic training with B Co 1st Bn 11th Inf at Fort Carson, Colorado and was sent to Vietnam in August 1966 as part of the 7th Cavalry attached to the 1st Cavalry Division.

In December 1966, while on patrol in the Republic of Vietnam with Company B of the 5th Battalion, his unit received heavy fire from concealed enemy positions. During an attempted encirclement of the platoon by the Vietnamese forces, Albanese fixed a bayonet to his weapon and charged the enemy positions. Upon arriving and momentarily silencing the enemy fire, Albanese discovered that the ditch he had charged was a well-entrenched position. He continued 100 metres through the position, killing at least eight enemy snipers despite running out of ammunition, being forced to fight hand to hand, and being mortally wounded.

His actions enabled his unit to advance further, and he posthumously received the Medal of Honor, which was presented to his family at the Pentagon by Secretary of the Army Stanley Rogers Resor on February 16, 1968. He is buried in Evergreen-Washelli Memorial Park and Funeral Home in Seattle, Washington. His name is found on Panel 12E, Row 131 of the Vietnam War Memorial.

In 2014 in his native country town Cornedo Vicentino in Italy named a street in his honor.

Medal of Honor citation
Citation:
For conspicuous gallantry and intrepidity in action at the risk of his life and beyond the call of duty. Pfc. Albanese's platoon, while advancing through densely covered terrain to establish a blocking position, received intense automatic weapons fire from close range. As other members maneuvered to assault the enemy position, Pfc. Albanese was ordered to provide security for the left flank of the platoon. Suddenly, the left flank received fire from enemy located in a well-concealed ditch. Realizing the imminent danger to his comrades from this fire, Pfc. Albanese fixed his bayonet and moved aggressively into the ditch. His action silenced the sniper fire, enabling the platoon to resume movement toward the main enemy position. As the platoon continued to advance, the sound of heavy firing emanated from the left flank from a pitched battle that ensued in the ditch which Pfc. Albanese had entered. The ditch was actually a well-organized complex of enemy defenses designed to bring devastating flanking fire on the forces attacking the main position. Pfc. Albanese, disregarding the danger to himself, advanced 100 meters along the trench and killed 6 of the snipers, who were armed with automatic weapons. Having exhausted his ammunition, Pfc. Albanese was mortally wounded when he engaged and killed 2 more enemy soldiers in fierce hand-to-hand combat. His unparalleled actions saved the lives of many members of his platoon who otherwise would have fallen to the sniper fire from the ditch, and enabled his platoon to successfully advance against an enemy force of overwhelming numerical superiority. Pfc. Albanese's extraordinary heroism and supreme dedication to his comrades were commensurate with the finest traditions of the military service and remain a tribute to himself, his unit, and the U.S. Army.

See also

List of Medal of Honor recipients
List of Medal of Honor recipients for the Vietnam War
List of Italian American Medal of Honor recipients

Notes

References

 Echi di Pianto dall'Indocina Francese by Franco Lovato, edited by SGI Edizioni Torino 2013.  translated in english book Lewis a man, an Hero

1946 births
1966 deaths
United States Army Medal of Honor recipients
American military personnel killed in the Vietnam War
United States Army soldiers
Foreign-born Medal of Honor recipients
Vietnam War recipients of the Medal of Honor
Italian emigrants to the United States
United States Army personnel of the Vietnam War
Franklin High School (Seattle) alumni
Boeing people
People from Vicenza